Mesoteuthis is a genus of belemnite, an extinct group of cephalopods.

Taxonomical history
A belemnite originally described as Cylindroteuthis confessa has been re-described as Mesoteuthis soloniensis.

See also

 Belemnite
 List of belemnites

References

http://www.servinghistory.com/topics/Mesoteuthis

Belemnites
Jurassic cephalopods
Extinct animals of Europe
Toarcian first appearances
Middle Jurassic extinctions